Al-Said Barakah (1260–1280; original name: Muhammed Barakah Qan, royal name: al-Malik al-Said Nasir al-Din Barakah was a Mamluk Sultan who ruled  from 1277 to 1279 after the death of his father Baibars. His mother was a daughter of Barka Khan, aformer Khwarazmian emir.

Barakah was born in Cairo. His succession went smoothly, and al-Said set about limiting the power of the emirs from his father's administration.  One, his father's viceroy, died under suspicious circumstances.  Others were jailed and then released. In their place, al-Said promoted his own mamluks.  He also sent Qalawun and Baysari, two of the most powerful emirs, to raid Cilician Armenia and Qal'at al-Rum in 1279, as a way of keeping them busy and away from the seat of power.  Each had 10,000 troops.  Al-Said's plan was to have both of them arrested on their return, but another amir, Kuvenduk, warned them of the plan, and when they returned, al-Said was forced to abdicate.  His seven-year-old brother Sulamish was placed on the throne in his place, under the guardianship of Qalawun, who became the effective sultan.

Personal life
His only wife was Ghaziya Khatun. She was the daughter of Sultan Qalawun. She was betrothed to him on 28 May 1276, with a dowry of five thousand dinars. The wedding took place on 8 June 1277. She died in August 1288.

Death
Exiled to Al Karak fortress, in Jordan, he died there in 1280.

References

 Reuven Amitai-Preiss (1995), Mongols and Mamluks: The Mamluk-Īlkhānid War, 1260-1281, pp. 179–225. Cambridge University Press, .

1260 births
1280 deaths
Royalty from Cairo
Bahri sultans
13th-century Mamluk sultans
People of Cuman descent